Haunting: Australia is an Australian paranormal television series that premiered on 3 February 2014 on Syfy. The series was commissioned by SF in July 2013, with production beginning in August 2013 and set to premiere on the network in 2014. However, following the closure of SF on 31 December 2013 and the launch of Syfy as its replacement, the series instead premiered on the newly launched Syfy channel on 3 February 2014.

Premise 
International paranormal investigator Robb Demarest selects his paranormal team of ghost hunters, psychics, mediums, and clairvoyants, to investigate Australia's most haunted locations.

Opening introduction: (narrated by Robb Demarest):

Paranormal team 
 Ian Lawman – From the UK, "bad boy" medium and ordained psychic exorcist.
 Ray Jorden – From the UK, "old-school supernatural sleuth", paranormal investigator.
 Gaurav Tiwari – From India, ghost hunter and metaphysicist.
 Allen Tiller – From Australia, accomplished paranormal researcher, investigator award winning historian.
 Rayleen Kable – From Australia, Medium Clairvoyant.
 Robb Demarest – From the U.S., lead investigator.

Episodes

Broadcast 
In the United States the series airs on Syfy, premiering 24 March 2015.

See also 
 Apparitional experience
 Parapsychology
 Ghost hunting
 Haunted locations in the United States

References

External links 
  (Australia)
  (U.S.)

Paranormal reality television series
2014 Australian television series debuts
2014 Australian television series endings
2010s Australian reality television series
English-language television shows